Daniel McLaughlin (born March 18, 1974) is a professional sportscaster who formerly worked on the St. Louis Cardinals and St. Louis Blues telecasts on the cable television channel Bally Sports Midwest. He used to be a play-by-play announcer for the NFL on Fox.

Early life
Dan McLaughlin was born on March 18, 1974, in St. Louis, Missouri. He grew up in the St. Louis area where his father was a school teacher. Following his graduation from St. John Vianney High School in suburban Kirkwood, Missouri, McLaughlin attended Lindenwood University in Saint Charles where he played baseball. Setting his sights on sports broadcasting from an early age, McLaughlin performed a variety of broadcasting duties at university-owned KCLC while a student at Lindenwood.

Broadcast career
While in college, McLaughlin served an internship at KMOX radio in St. Louis, and he became a sports talk show host with the station in 1996. McLaughlin soon found himself as a frequent contributor to St. Louis Blues telecasts on KPLR-TV and FSN Midwest. In 2000, he became the play-by-play broadcaster for FSN's Cardinals games. Additionally, McLaughlin did play-by-play for the Mizzou Tiger and Missouri Valley Conference basketball games and occasional regional college football games for ESPN.

He also owns a media company, Scoops with Danny Mac, where he interviews nationally-known sports figures for both a television show and podcast. Scoops with Danny Mac is known for candid one-on-one interviews between McLaughlin and his subject.

Bally Sports placed McLaughlin on leave in December of 2022 following his arrest for persistent driving while intoxicated. Bally Sports announced it had parted ways with McLaughlin on December 15th, 2022.

Personal life
McLaughlin and wife, Libby, are the parents of two sons and two daughters. The McLaughlins are involved in several St. Louis area charities, including hosting the annual "Dan McLaughlin Golf Tournament" to benefit special education.

Drunk driving arrests
On August 16, 2010, McLaughlin was arrested on charges of driving while intoxicated. Under a plea agreement, he was allowed to keep his drivers license, but was given two years of probation. 

On September 30, 2011, McLaughlin was involved in a one-vehicle crash near his Chesterfield, Missouri home. Police investigated and arrested McLaughlin on charges of drunk driving, and leaving the scene of an accident. Following the second arrest, Fox Sports Midwest suspended McLaughlin indefinitely, removing him from all remaining regular-season Cardinals broadcasts, and post-game specials during the teams playoff and World Series run. In addition to suspension from his job with Fox Sports, McLaughlin lost his employment broadcasting Mizzou and Missouri Valley Conference games, as well as his regular appearances on KMOX radio.  

McLaughlin was reinstated by Fox in February 2012 after being treated for alcoholism at a rehab facility. He also returned to KMOX, but in a much more limited role. Said McLaughlin to the St. Louis Post-Dispatch of his newfound sobriety: "I feel better than I have in a decade, at least."

On December 5, 2022, McLaughlin was once again arrested in Creve Coeur, Missouri, for driving under the influence with a bond amount of $25,000. He was charged with persistent Driving While Intoxicated, a felony offense.

References

College football announcers
National Football League announcers
1974 births
Living people
College basketball announcers in the United States
Lindenwood University people
Major League Baseball broadcasters
National Hockey League broadcasters
People from St. Louis
St. Louis Blues announcers
St. Louis Cardinals announcers
Women's college basketball announcers in the United States